Bighoto is a tract of country starting from Delhi territory, from Rewari on the borders of Mewat to the Bikaner frontier and was dominated by s and Yaduvanshi Ahirs (Yadavs).

Etymology
The name of Bighoto, or Bighota as it is sometimes called, is derived from Bigha Raj Chauhan, a descendant of Prithviraj Chauhan.

History

In the neighborhood of Bighoto existed the territories of Dhundhoti, Rath and Chandain. Bighoto region, established by and named after Bigha Raj Chauhan, was an area of 12 villages including greater part of Taoru that were collectively known as Chandain, remained under the Chand Chauhans, descendants of Sahesh Mal Chauhan. According to Sir Henry Miers Elliot, Bighoto included Rewari, Kot Kasim, Bawal, Kanon, Pataudi, Kotkasim, and a great part of the Bahraich jagir. Sahesh Mal was a son of Raja Sangat Singh Chauhan. Sangat was the great grandson of Chahir Deo Chauhan, brother of famous rajput king Prithviraj Chauhan.

A popular saying is बोघोतो को दू धानी खोरो और चौहान; "Bighoto has two lords, Khoros (amongst Ahirs), and Chauhans (amongst Rajputs)."

See also
 Administrative divisions of Haryana
 Ahirwal
 Alwar State
 Bharatpur State
 History of Haryana
 History of Rajasthan
 Mewat

References

Geography of Delhi
Regions of India